Köttmannsdorf is a town in the district of Klagenfurt-Land in the Austrian state of Carinthia.

Geography
Köttmannsdorf lies southwest of Klagenfurt in the heights of the Sattnitz Mountains. The highest point in the municipality at 921 m is the Sabalahöhe in the west, and the lowest point the Ferlach Reservoir at 441 m. The Rekabach flows from west to east through the municipality, its name coming from the Slovene name for river, reka.

Population
According to the 2001 census 6.4% of the population are Carinthian Slovenes.

References

Cities and towns in Klagenfurt-Land District